Organic, Inc. is a digitally-led advertising agency that is a member of DAS Group of Companies, a division of Omnicom Group Inc. It is headquartered in New York City with additional offices in Detroit and Los Angeles. It was one of the original digital agencies, and was founded in 1993 by Jonathan Nelson, Brian Behlendorf, Cliff Skolnick and Matthew Nelson. The firm completed an IPO in February 2000 under the ticker OGNC,. Due to the economic effects of the Dot-com bubble, Organic was re-privatized in 2001, and became a subsidiary of Omnicom in 2003.

References

External links 
Company Website

Digital marketing companies of the United States
Companies based in San Francisco
Marketing companies established in 1993